Carrera (Spanish for "race" and "career") is a brand of Porsche automobile. The name commemorates the company's success in the Carrera Panamericana race. 

The following vehicles have been called Carrera:
 Porsche 356
 Porsche 904
 Porsche 911
 Porsche 911 (1963–1989)
 Porsche 930 (1975–1989)
 Porsche 964 (1989–1993)
 Porsche 993 (1993–1998)
 Porsche 996 (1998–2004)
 Porsche 997 (2004–2013)
 Porsche 991 (2011–2019)
 Porsche 992 (2019–)
 Porsche 924
 Porsche Carrera GT

In fiction
Sally Carrera, a fictional character from Disney Pixar's Cars franchise is based on the Porsche 996 Carrera.

Carrera
Carrera Panamericana